Anca Moșoiu (born 1973) is a technical consultant and web developer who established the Oakland, California co-working space Tech Liminal in 2009. She is credited with helping to build the tech industry in Oakland. She has been described as a "tech guru". She has worked in the business applications industry for more than 15 years at companies such as Razorfish, Sony, Juniper Networks, and Cisco systems.

Early life
Mosoiu moved to the United States from Romania with her family in 1983 when she was 9 years old. Her family had been granted political asylum "before the revolution toppled the Soviet-era autocrat Nicolae Ceausescu". She grew up in Oakland attending local middle schools.

Mosoiu attended Massachusetts Institute of Technology, and earned her bachelor's degree in computer science in 1995.

Tech Liminal
As a technical consultant Mosoiu spent a lot of time traveling and in hotel rooms. Because she wanted to work with people and be part of a community, Mosoiu founded Tech Liminal. Tech Liminal was the first technology co-working space in Oakland.

"It's easier to have more impact in Oakland with little more than gumption," Mosoiu said. "It feels like we're all in this together."

References

External links
Anca Mosoiu's website

American women computer scientists
American computer scientists
1973 births
Romanian emigrants to the United States
Businesspeople from Oakland, California
Living people
21st-century American women